Abnecotants Island is a very small island in the middle of Squam Swamp in northeastern portion of the island of Nantucket in Massachusetts.

References
http://www.topozone.com/map.asp?lon=-70.0011255&lat=41.313177&datum=nad83

Coastal islands of Massachusetts
Islands of Nantucket, Massachusetts